The Chlorophytina are a proposed basal Tetraphytina clade. It is currently seen as sister of the Pedinomonadaceae. It contains the more well-known green alga and is characterized by the presence of phycoplasts.

Below is a consensus reconstruction of green algal relationships, mainly based on molecular data et al.

References

Chlorophyta
Plant unranked clades